are Shinto shamans. The term has a few different writings, one is the 巫, character in common with Miko, however the term is gender neutral and linked to the Chinese Wu shamans.

Overview 
A kannagi represents the act of communicating with a devotee of a deity, or a possession of a deity, or a God, or a person who serves in that role. For more information, see Shaman (Fu, Kan-nagi).
Kumagusu Minakata, in his book "Ichiko ni kansuru koto", refers to Priestesss serving shrines as "kannagi", and to walking priestesses as "miko".

Depending on the shrine, the word "kannagi" is used to refer to a miko who serves the shrine, and the word "miko" is used to refer to a walking miko. (Ōmiwa Shrine), Waka (Shiogama Shrine), Tamayorihime, Osame (Katori Shrine), Osome (Kibitsu Shrine), Itsukiko (Matsuo Shrine) Suwa-taisha, Kibitsu Shrine,

Kunio Yanagita says that these two types of maidens were originally the same person, but were later separated, because there are other names for walking maidens, such as Oichi of Suwa Shrine, Sou-no-ichi of Atatsuta Shrine, and Waka of Shiogama Shrine.

Etymology 

  is a peaceful and calm state, and is mainly used for emotions and circumstances.
  is synonymous with calming, but nowadays it often refers to the state of the sea where there is no wind and there are no calm waves . In addition, it is one of the few  and represents the state where the wind has stopped.
  refers to a state in which a mountain is collapsing and becoming flat, or a flat field where vegetation is cut, but it also means to drive it sideways (to remove it). From that , it means cleansing as a Shinto ritual . In addition, there are Nagi Shinto rituals all over Japan, and it is said to be an act of calming storms and winds in the inland regions . A rare character is "𡵢 (Nagi)", which is an Ateji character for Nagi because it means collapse.

There are various kanji notations for "Nagi", and it is often used as a homonym for Tree, mountain, or place name. Most of them relate to places of Belief in Japanese Shinto, Myth and Koshinto, and are used as part of the names of Shinto shrines and Japanese Gods. It is also used in the name of Izanagi and the sword Kusanagi no Tsurugi. It is used in the name of the tree Nageia nagi

References 

Japanese folk religion
Miko
Shinto shrines
Shinto